Smilax pseudochina is a perennial herb in the greenbriar family. It is commonly called bamboo vine or false chinaroot. Its range extends up the Atlantic Coast of the United States, from Long Island in New York State south to Georgia.

Description

Smilax pseudochina is a climbing herbaceous vine which grows up to 2 meters (7 feet) tall, the thornless stems only live one year but will regrow the next. The stems have numerous tendrils which twist around objects and help the plant climb. The leaves are glabrous and triangular to oval (ovate) shaped and may almost be hastate at the base and range from 5–12 cm long to 2–5 cm wide.  The leaf edges are often straight or almost concave, this helps distinguish it from other Smilax spp. which typically have convex edges on the leaves. The stem is sometimes unbranched but may have a few branches. The flowers are dioecious and greenish with 6 tepals. The flowers open in June and the berries mature in September. The berries are round, blue or black with a waxy coat and borne on long umbels axially from the upper leaves; these umbels contain from 10-35 flowers or fruits.

False chinaroot grows in dry to moist habitats, ranging from bogs, marshes, wet woods to dry woods, and dry to damp sandy thickets

Endangered status
False chinaroot is listed as extirpated in Pennsylvania, endangered in New York, and threatened in Maryland.

Uses
The Cherokees of North America would make fritters from the plant's fresh, macerated tuberous roots. After the roots had been ground and soaked in water, the water was decanted, and the root mash, after leaving it out to dry, was mixed with fine corn meal, made into a dough-like batter and then deep-fried in animal fat.

See also
 Chinaroot

References

External links
Plants of Southern New Jersey, Citizens United to Protect the Maurice River
Plants for a Future

Smilacaceae
Flora of the Eastern United States
Plants described in 1753
Taxa named by Carl Linnaeus